Gerald Downey (born October 1, 1970) is an American actor. He is best known for playing the role of McSweeten in Leverage. He currently plays the "Busch Guy" for Anheuser-Busch's Busch commercials.

Filmography

Films

Television

References

External links

1980 births
Living people
American male film actors
American male television actors
20th-century American male actors
21st-century American male actors